In ice hockey, a forward is a player, and a position on the ice, whose primary responsibility is to score and assist goals. Generally, the forwards try to stay in three different lanes of the ice going from goal to goal. It is not mandatory, however, to stay in a lane. Staying in a lane aids in forming the common offensive strategy known as a triangle. One forward obtains the puck and then the forwards pass it between themselves making the goalie move side to side.  This strategy opens up the net for scoring opportunities. This strategy allows for a constant flow of the play, attempting to maintain the control of play by one team in the offensive zone. The forwards can pass to the defence players playing at the blue line, thus freeing up the play and allowing either a shot from the point (blue line position where the defence stands) or a pass back to the offence.  This then begins the triangle again.

Forwards also shared defensive responsibilities on the ice with the defencemen.

Each team has three forwards on each line:
 Left Wing
 Centre
 Right Wing

See also

Rover (ice hockey)
Power forward
Defenceman
Goaltender
List of NHL players

 
Ice hockey positions
Ice hockey terminology